is a village in Mut district of Mersin Province, Turkey to the northeast of the town of Mut. The village was founded during the Ottoman Empire era. The main economic activity is dairy farming and growing apricots, olives, hickory nuts, pomegranates and figs.

References

Villages in Mut District